Puppigerus is an extinct genus of sea turtle from the Eocene. It is known from finds in the United States, the United Kingdom, Belgium, Denmark, and Uzbekistan.

Taxonomy
Puppigerus was described by Edward Drinker Cope in 1870. As of 1997, P. camperi and P. crassicostata were considered the two valid species. P. camperi was later thought to be the sole species of the genus until the 2005 discovery of P. nessovi from Uzbekistan.

Description
 
Although cheloniids such as Puppigerus first appeared during the Cretaceous, several traits of this genus give it more of a resemblance to modern cheloniids: its "huge" eyes pointed sideways rather than upward, unlike more primitive cheloniids, and its shell was completely ossified. The pygal (rearmost plate of the upper shell) also lacked the notch seen in earlier cheloniids. It was a herbivore, living on marine vegetation, and one of the "best-adapted" prehistoric turtles; its "unusually large" eyes helped it gather as much light as possible, and its specialized jaw structure kept it from accidentally breathing in water. Its front legs were flipper-like, but its hind legs were not developed in this manner, suggesting it would have spent considerable time on dry land, where females would have laid their eggs.

Palaeoecology
Puppigerus camperi is known from the London Clay and Bracklesham Beds of England, as well as the Sables de Bruxelles and the Sables de Wemmel of Belgium. P. nessovi is known from the Dzheroi 2 locality of Uzbekistan.
A Puppigerus species is also known from the Fur Formation of Denmark.

References

Cenozoic turtles of North America
Eocene reptiles of Europe
Cheloniidae
Eocene reptiles
Fossil taxa described in 1870
Eocene reptiles of Asia
Prehistoric turtle genera
Taxa named by Edward Drinker Cope
Extinct turtles
Fur Formation